Per Holst (born 28 March 1939) is a Danish film producer. He has produced more than 50 films since 1967. In 1997, he was a member of the jury at the 47th Berlin International Film Festival.

Filmography

See also 
 Asta Film

References

External links 
 
 

1939 births
Danish film producers
Living people
Producers who won the Best Film Guldbagge Award
Bodil Honorary Award recipients